Yener Mehmet Sonuşen is a Turkish businessman. He is on the boards of Savola Food Inc., Yudum Food Co., Bahçeşehir Koleji and Egypt food Co.

Education 
Yener Sonuşen holds a B.A. in Management from Boğaziçi University, Master's degree from International Christian University in Tokyo, Japan with studies in international negotiations and Ph.D. in cross cultural negotiations from Marmara University in Istanbul, Turkey.

Career
Sonuşen was the Board member and COO of Ülker group of companies until December 2005. Since then, he is a management consultant, for reorganization and negotiation projects. Until 2012 he was the Honorary Consul of Kazakhstan Government in Turkey for some years.

Other interests
Sonuşen is the author of "Fuji Dağıyla Konuştum",  where he talks about his experiences throughout his time in Japan.

He is a member of different organizations and associations, including Japan Institute of Negotiations, and continues to participate in workshops from time to time at Insead and IMD-MIT Sloan. Sonuşen taught an 'Advanced Management' course, in Boğaziçi University He has been honored by IESC for his contributions in promoting Free Enterprise and Democracy in Turkey.

Notes

External links
 Yener Sonuşen Profile at LinkedIn
 Yener Sonuşen profile at Business Week

Turkish businesspeople
Living people
1959 births
Boğaziçi University alumni
International Christian University alumni
Marmara University alumni